Hypertension and brachydactyly syndrome (HTNB), also known as Bilginturan syndrome and brachydactyly type E among others, is a very rare genetic disorder.

It was first reported in 1973 by N. Bilginturan et al. The estimated prevalence is less than 1 out of 1,000,000.

Symptoms 
The disorder is characterized by:
 severe salt-independent but age-dependent hypertension
 brachydactyly malformations of the hands and fingers
 increased fibroblast growth rate
 neurovascular contact at the rostral-ventrolateral medulla
 altered baroreflex blood pressure regulation
 death from stroke before age 50 years when untreated

Genetics 
The disorder is thought to be related to mutations in the PDE3A gene.

Treatment

References

External links 

Genetic diseases and disorders
Syndromes